is a tribute album featuring Lantis artists covering songs from the popular Gundam metaseries. It was released in Japan on December 9, 2009, as part of Gundam's 30th anniversary celebrations.

Track list

External links
Official website
Lantis release data

2009 compilation albums
Gundam
Lantis (company) albums